Kseniya Kimovna Borodina (born Amoyeva) (born on March 8, 1983) is a Russian television presenter and actress. Since 2004 she has been the presenter of the reality show House 2.

Personal life 
From 2008 to 2011 Kseniya was married to businessman Yury Budagov, they have one child together — a daughter named Maria Budagova (born June 10, 2009). From June 2011 to August 2012 Kseniya has been in relationship with now ex-member of House 2 Mikhail Teryokhin, they were engaged just a month before their split.

On 3 July 2015, she married businessman Kurban Omarov. Besides Maria, they have two other children: step-son Omar (born on 1 February 2008) and daughter Teona "Tenya" (born on 22 December 2015). They moved to Zhukovski region in 2016, at the current moment Kseniya lives in Moscow with her family.

References

External links
 
 

1983 births
Living people
Russian entertainers
Russian television presenters
Russian actresses
Russian television actresses
Actresses from Moscow
Russian women television presenters
Russian people of Armenian descent
Yazidi people